Deise Rosa de Almeida (born 8 September 1974) is a Brazilian Christian singer and songwriter.

Biography 
Deise Rosa was born in a Christian family and since childhood has always been involved with music. With only eleven years old she started singing in the choir of the Baptist Church of Brasilândia in São Paulo.

In 2002, Deise received her call to the music area, but it was only in 2005 that materialized when she released her first album independently. The album titled Tuas Promessas was recorded by guitarist Tim Mendes in his studio.

In 2010, the second album of her career was launched once again recorded at Tim Mendes studio. Viver Pela Fé, the name of her second album, it received rave reviews and was highly praised. The album tour has undergone several cities the state of São Paulo reached multitudes.

Discography 
 Solo career
Tuas Promessas (2005)
Viver Pela Fé (2010)

References

External links
Official Website
 Songs/Videos Links

1974 births
Living people
Brazilian Christian religious leaders
Christian music songwriters
Performers of contemporary worship music
Brazilian gospel singers
Brazilian singer-songwriters
Singers from São Paulo
Portuguese-language singers
Brazilian evangelicals
Brazilian Christians
21st-century Brazilian singers
21st-century Brazilian women singers
Brazilian women singer-songwriters